Béni Ounif is a town and commune in Béchar Province, Algeria, coextensive with the district of Béni Ounif. It has a population of 10,732 as of the 2008 census, up from 8,199 in 1998, and had an annual growth rate of 2.8%, the second highest in the province.

History
The Béni Ounif massacre took place in the commune near the Moroccan border, on 15 August 1999. Guerrillas stopped a bus at a fake roadblock and killed some 29 people.  President Abdelaziz Bouteflika suggested that the terrorists in question had found shelter in Morocco, but later retracted the accusation. The Moroccan Interior Minister Driss Basri denied the allegations.

Geography

To the south the landscape is mostly flat, with a few small hills, while to the north there is a range of taller, rocky hills running from west to east along the Algeria–Morocco border. Aside from the river valleys which support vegetation and agriculture, the low rainfall in the area results in an arid, barren landscape.

Climate

Béni Ounif has a hot desert climate, with very hot summers and cool winters, and light precipitation throughout the year, especially in summer, although a little more rain does fall than in other towns in Béchar Province.

Economy

Agriculture is the main industry in Béni Ounif. There are a total of 71,800 date palms planted in the commune. As of 2009 there were 23,210 sheep, 16,664 goats, 1,766 camels, and 444 cattle.

Tourism is a part of Béni Ounif's economy; there is one hotel in the town. Tourist attractions include palm groves, the old ksar and an ancient fort.

Infrastructure and housing

75% of Béni Ounif's population is connected to drinking water (the lowest rate in the province), 96% is connected to the sewerage system, and 87% (including 2,412 buildings) have access to electricity. There is one fuel service station in the town.

Béni Ounif has a total of 2,576 houses, of which 1,754 are occupied, giving an occupation rate of 6.1 inhabitants per occupied building.

Transportation

Béni Ounif is on the N6 highway between Mecheria to the northwest and Béchar to the southwest. While a road leads from the western side of the city to the Moroccan town of Figuig, the border has been closed since 1994.

Béni Ounif has a station on the Méchéria-Béchar railway line operated by the National Company for Rail Transport.

Education

There are 10 elementary schools, with 70 classrooms including 47 in use. There are a total of 2,262 school students.

5.8% of the population has a tertiary education, and another 20.3% has competed secondary education. The overall literacy rate is 79.3%, and is 86.0% among males and 72.7% among females.

Health

Béni Ounif has one polyclinic, 8-room care facilities, a maternity ward, and 2 private pharmacies.

Culture

Béni Ounif has a cinema with 315 seats.

Religion

Béni Ounif has 6 operational mosques, with another 3 under construction.

Localities
The commune is composed of 11 localities:

Beni Ounif (Centre)
Jenan Dar
Fendi
Rosta Taïba
Zoubia
Oued Namous
Saf Saf
Laouedj
Douis
Bouaiache
Hador

Neighbouring towns and cities

References

See also
 List of Algerian massacres of the 1990s

Communes of Béchar Province